Montopoli di Sabina is a town and  (municipality) in the Province of Rieti in the Italian region of Latium, located about  northeast of Rome and about  southwest of Rieti. In 2011, it had a population of 4,222.

History
The town was first mentioned in 1055, in a document of Farfa Abbey. It is locally known as The Town of Privateers.

Geography
Montopoli, located in the southwestern corner of the province, at the borders with the one of Rome, borders with the municipalities of Castelnuovo di Farfa, Fara in Sabina, Fiano Romano (RM), Nazzano (RM), Poggio Mirteto, Salisano and Torrita Tiberina (RM). Its southwestern borders with Fiano are crossed by the Tiber river.

Montopoli counts the hamlets (frazioni) of Bocchignano, Casenove, Colonnetta La Memoria, Ferruti, Granari, Granica, Ponte Sfondato, Ponticchio and Santa Maria.

Demographics

Main sights
The Modern Automata Museum, founded in 2001, is located in the town
The cyclopean masonry of Grotte di Torri is located nearby the village of Ponte Sfondato

Gallery

Transport
Nearest railway station, Poggio Mirteto, is 7 km far and lies in Poggio Mirteto Scalo. It is part of the Roman suburban railway line FL1 Orte–Fiumicino, a line that crosses the southwestern corner of the municipal territory.

References

External links

 Montopoli official website
 Modern Automata Museum website

Cities and towns in Lazio